John "Jack" Choquette (December 28, 1928 – February 23, 2013) was an American stock car and modified stock car racing driver. He was the winner of the 1954 NASCAR Modified Division championship and was the grandfather of ASA Midwest Tour driver Jeff Choquette.

Career 
Born in Montclair, New Jersey, Choquette made his name in racing in southern Florida, having moved from New Jersey to make his home in Lake Worth. He was a regular competitor at Palm Beach Speedway and Medley Speedway during the 1950s, in addition to competing at other Florida tracks. Competing in NASCAR's Modified division, he won the series' 1953 Southeastern regional championship, and in 1954 was awarded the national NASCAR Modified championship, beating Tommy Elliott, Banjo Matthews and Cotton Owens for the title.

In 1955 and 1956, Choquette made six starts in the NASCAR Grand National Division, now known as the Sprint Cup Series; his best finish in the series was second, which he achieved in his first race in the series in February 1955 at Palm Beach Speedway. His final race in the Grand National Division was on the Daytona Beach Road Course in February 1956; he started seventh in the event, but finished 68th in a field of 76 cars. He remained a regular Modified driver into the 1960s, as well as competing in the Micro division at Boynton Speedway.

Choquette's son, John, and grandson, Jeff, both followed him into racing careers; Jack  assisted his grandson's racing efforts in ASA and NASCAR competition.

Choquette died on February 23, 2013; he was buried in Royal Palm Beach, Florida, leaving four children, seventeen grandchildren and seven great-grandchildren.

Motorsports career results

NASCAR
(key) (Bold – Pole position awarded by qualifying time. Italics – Pole position earned by points standings or practice time. * – Most laps led.)

Grand National Series

References
Citations

Bibliography

 Gunnell, John (1994). Race Car Flashback. Iola, WI: Krause Publications. 
 Menke, Frank Grant (1960). The Pictorial Encyclopedia of Sports. Glenview, IL: Progress Research Corp.

External links
 

1928 births
2013 deaths
People from Montclair, New Jersey
People from Loxahatchee, Florida
Racing drivers from Florida
NASCAR drivers